Filippo Bonaffino (fl. 1623) was an Italian composer.

Life and career
Filippo Bonaffino is thought to have been born in Messina. In 1623, he published a book of 18 Madrigali concertati for two to four voices with continuo, titled Madrigali concertati a due, tre e quattro Voci per cantar, e sonar nel Clauecimbalo, Chitarrone, ò altro simile Instrumento. The collection includes a setting of Ancidetemi pur, made popular by Arcadelt in the 16th century, and also two solo songs for bass and continuo dedicated to "Signor Gio[v]anni Watchin (John Watkin), English gentleman."  The other songs include settings of text by Luigi Groto, Angelo Grillo, Maurizio Moro, Giambattista Marino and Ottavio Rinuccini.

Bonaffino died in Messina.

References

Italian male classical composers
Madrigal composers
Italian Baroque composers
17th-century Italian composers
Musicians from Messina
17th-century male musicians